Ploshchad Gagarina (Gagarin's Square) is a station on the Moscow Central Circle of the Moscow Metro. The station offers a free direct transfer to Leninsky Prospekt of the Kaluzhsko-Rizhskaya Line. Ploshchad Gagarina is the only underground station on the Moscow Central Circle line.

After its first month of service, the station was the most used on the line with daily ridership of 25,800 passengers. The second most heavily used station was Vladykino with 18,300 passengers. As of January 2017, the station remains the most heavily trafficked on the line.

Gallery

References

External links 
 mkzd.ru

Moscow Metro stations
Railway stations in Russia opened in 2016
Moscow Central Circle stations
Railway stations located underground in Russia